Upin & Ipin (Jawi: اوڤين دان ايڤين) is a Malaysian animated television series produced by Les' Copaque Production. The series features the life and adventures of the eponymous bald twin brothers in a fictional Malaysia. Originally a side project for the blockbuster animated film Geng: The Adventure Begins, Upin & Ipin was introduced on TV9 in Malaysia on 13 September 2007 as a six episode Ramadan/Hari Raya Aidilfitri special, to teach children the significance of the Islamic holy month of Ramadan and Shawwal. A second season, also centered on Ramadan, aired in 2008. Its third season, Upin Ipin and Friends, debuted internationally on Disney Channel Asia the following year, and began to focus more on the everyday lives of The Twins and their friends. As of 2023, Upin & Ipin is the longest-running Malaysian animated series, currently in its 16th year of production, and is currently in its 16th season.

In Indonesia, Upin & Ipin is aired on MNCTV (formerly TPI) since 22 August 2009.

Premise
Upin and Ipin are five-year-old Malaysian twins who reside with their elder sister Ros and grandmother Uda (whom they call Opah) in a village house in Kampung Durian Runtuh. They lost their parents in their infancy. Upin and Ipin study in the village's Tadika Mesra (kindergarten) with a group of classmates, including the adorable and right-thinking Mei Mei, the poetic joker Jarjit Singh, the clumsy and short-tempered Ehsan, the easygoing and sarcastic Fizi, and the entrepreneurial and meticulous Mail.

The headman of Kampung Durian Runtuh is Isnin bin Khamis, better known as Tok Dalang Ranggi, the Wayang Kulit champion. Tok Dalang keeps a cluster of rambutan trees for commercial purposes, and a rooster named "Rembo". Among the village's other notable residents are Muthu, owner of the village's only food stall who lives with his animal whisperer son Rajoo and pet steer Sapy; Salleh (Sally), a transgender-apparent who owns a mobile library; and Ah Tong, a strident-voiced vegetable farmer. Additionally, a new character was introduced in later seasons: an Indonesian girl named Susanti who moved to Kampung Durian Runtuh with her family.

Broadcast history

Classic Season (Season 1-2)

Season 1 (2007)
The first season of Upin & Ipin was aired on Fridays, Saturdays and Sundays, 7.30 pm, in conjunction with Ramadan and Eid-ul-fitri, which tells of the twins Upin and Ipin on their first fasting months. The first four shorts debuted early in the holy weeks, followed by re-airings from 22 September to 11 October, finally ending with two final episodes premiering on Hari Raya itself. This series bore away the Best Animation award in the 2007 New York International Film Festival.

Season 2 (2008)
The second series, under its full title Upin & Ipin: Setahun Kemudian, went on air in conjunction with Ramadan again, with 12 new episodes, the first six of which were aired and repeated on Fridays, Saturdays and Sundays, 7.00 pm throughout Ramadan while the other six premiered for Hari Raya from 1 till 6 of Shawal. This season was sponsored by Colgate-Palmolive United States via its Colgate Kayu Sugi toothpaste. Tadika Mesra opened on the first episode. Cikgu Jasmin started being a teacher in the first episode of "tadika".

New Season (Season 3-Present)

Season 3 (2009)
Under the new full title Upin & Ipin dan Kawan-Kawan, a third season of the series premiered on TV9 on 2 February 2009, with each episode lasting up to seven minutes. As a year-long production season, it had frequent in-season breaks and failed by repeats, and also experienced some record changes. In this season, the series left the Saturday midnight prime time slot on TV9 and the third season was instead broadcast daily on the Canadian channel Showcase. From 14 May, the TV series received pre sponsorship from TM, which placed its co-brand on the show to this date. In the year-end school break season, it became apparent that new episodes are strangely debuted on school holidays, with new episodes premiering on Mondays, Tuesdays and Wednesdays, 5.30 am (repeats for the rest of the week) throughout the six-week holiday season. This is also the first season of Upin & Ipin for the international market, airing on Disney Channel Asia & Singapore beginning 15 November 2009 with dubs in English (the official dub, as the credits and episode titles are in Indonesian), Mandarin and other languages.

Season 4 (2010)
Season four of Upin & Ipin dan Kawan-kawan debuted on TV9 on 15 March 2010 with the episode "Juara Kampung (Part 1)", with a brand new opening sequence and color pencil and exercise book-themed title card. The main focus on this season is as a tribute to sports, as it was developed in a year full of sport events. Season 4 was co-recorded by TM.

Season 5 (2011)
Season 5 first aired on TV9 on 12 March 2011 with the episode "Belajar Lagi". As with previous seasons it opens with a new sequence, now based on a papercraft theme. This season airs every Saturday at 7:30 pm to 9:30 am.

Season 6 (2012)
Season 6 aired every Sunday at 6 pm on TV9. This also features a retirement of a character. Cikgu Jasmin started being a teacher for 3 years. Cikgu Jasmin retires and leaves the show to continue her studies in Kuala Lumpur. She was replaced by Cikgu Melati.

Season 7 (2013)
Upin and Ipin will start their fun story with the Chinese New Year story featuring Chinese girl, Mei Mei (美美) as the seventh season's premier. The episodes air on Saturday evenings at 6:30 pm. The first episode was scheduled to air on 2 March 2013, but due to technical problems the first episode have been pushed to 9 March 2013.

Season 8 (2014)
Season 8 started airing on 30 May 2014. The episodes air on the days when new episodes appear in three separate parts on a seven-minute slot at 5:30 pm during the school holidays. Starting from this season onwards it is produced in high-definition resolution where the HD versions of each episode in this season will appear on the DVD collection once it is released. TV9 airs the episodes in PAL format.

The character designs are also remodelled and improved to make them more lively. A new voice actress for Ros has been introduced. Season 8 also introduced a crossover with the Ultra Series Franchise in Episode 9, which is co-produced by Tsuburaya Productions.

Season 9 (2015)

Season 10 (2016)

Season 12 (2018)
Started on 13 May 2018 for Malaysia channel, Upin Ipin will started air all their episode including its movement on Astro Prima and will no longer air on TV9. It will be air on Monday to Friday at 7.00 am until 5.30 pm while Saturday and Sunday will be on 9.00 pm to 9.30 pm.

Home video
 Upin & Ipin DVD and VCD volumes 1–6 were distributed in Malaysia by Music Valley.
 Volume 7 – 11 were distributed by Sony Music.
 Volume 12 and above are distributed by Music Valley.

Season 1

Season 2

Season 3

Season 4

Season 5

Season 6

Season 7

Reception and cultural impact
The Upin & Ipin franchise has wielded its influence in countries of the Malay archipelago, notably in Malaysia and Indonesia which share linguistic and cultural similarities. Its first season landed its first award, for Best Animation in KLIFF 2007.

While season two was on air on Ramadan 2008, it was reportedly watched by 1.5 million viewers on TV9, making it the second most-watched animated series on all of Malaysian television, right behind Doraemon (1.6 mil), yet ahead of SpongeBob SquarePants (800,000). The popularity of Upin & Ipin could have attributed to the commercial success of Malaysia's first CGI-animated feature film, Geng: The Adventure Begins (2009), which featured the twin characters Upin and Ipin, propelling it into the RM 6.31 million mark throughout its seven-week run in Malaysian cinemas as one of the highest-grossing Malay-language films in history.

As the third season reaches its conclusion in late 2009, TV9 reports that Upin & Ipin was viewed by 1.6 million, making it the second most-viewed programme on the channel, just behind the free TV premiere of Geng which was watched by 2.45 million (scoring TVR 12.8).

Indonesia has been the most obvious export market for Upin & Ipin. In 2009, MNCTV which airs the series in the country reported a TVR of 10.5. Upin & Ipin has also been praised by the Indonesian press; for instance, Fadil Abidin for Analisa who remarked on the vastness of moral content and Islamic values, such as respect for those of different ethnic or religious backgrounds, in a communal setting consisting not only of Malays, Chinese and Indian Malaysians, but also Indonesians.

In March 2010, as the Balinese Hindu community prepare for Nyepi, images of ogoh-ogoh (demonic effigies used for the famed ngrupuk ritual on the eve of Nyepi) which largely resemble Upin & Ipin were exposed on Indonesian media. The effigy reportedly cost 4 million rupiah.

The Ultra Series crossover special was received positively on it airing in 2014. As a response, the crossover character in the special,  was officially recognized as a canon character by Tsuburaya Productions, later making its live debut in the web series Ultra Galaxy Fight in 2019.

In India it started to air in Hindi on hungama in May 2018.

Comics
Since December 2009, Upin & Ipin have been adapted into a monthly comic magazine series, aptly titled Majalah Komik Upin & Ipin to be circulated all over Malaysia, published by Nyla Sdn Bhd. Targeted at young readers, the magazine features screenshot comics of the Upin & Ipin TV series and the Geng: Pengembaraan Bermula film, voice actor and production crew profiles, and learning and activity sections.

Awards

 2007 Kuala Lumpur International Filem Festival
 Animasi Terbaik
 2009 Shout! Awards
 Best On-Screen Chemistry
 NEF-Awani ICT Awards 2010
 NEF-Awani Tun Dr Mahathir Award
 Best Brands in Animation
 Anugerah Bintang Popular Berita Harian 2012
 The Most Popular Local Animated Character
 UNICEF Malaysia's National Ambassadors 2013

Sponsorship
 Colgate (toothpaste)
S-26 Procal Gold
 Telekom Malaysia
 Proton (Malaysia Only)
 Suruhanjaya Pembasmian Rasuah Malaysia
 Hong Leong Bank
 UNICEF
 Toyota (Indonesia Only)
 Upin Ipin Toothpaste (Indonesia Only)
 Kartu AS (Indonesia Only) 
 SGM Eksplor (Indonesia Only)
 Walls Ice Cream (Indonesia Only)

See also

 Geng: The Adventure Begins
 Upin & Ipin: Jeng Jeng Jeng!
 Upin & Ipin: The Lone Gibbon Kris

References

External links
 Upin & Ipin website

8TV (Malaysian TV network) original programming
2007 Malaysian television series debuts
2000s animated television series
2000s Malaysian television series
2010s Malaysian television series
Animated television series about brothers
Animated television series about orphans
Animated television series about twins
Astro Ceria original programming
Astro Prima original programming
Malaysian children's animated comedy television series
TV9 (Malaysia) original programming
Works about twin brothers